The Suzhou Silk Museum is a museum in Suzhou, China. It documents the history of silk production and Suzhou embroidery from around 2000 BC. Exhibits include old looms with demonstrations, samples of ancient silk patterns, and an explanation of sericulture.  Of major note is a room full of live silk worms, eating mulberry leaves and spinning cocoons. By December, 2009, the live silkworms had been replaced with models.

References

External links
Suzhou Silk Museum 

Museums in Suzhou
Textile museums in China